Aframomum giganteum is a species of plant in the ginger family, Zingiberaceae. It was described by Daniel Oliver and D.Hanb.  and got its current name from Karl Moritz Schumann.

References 

giganteum